Pittsburg is an unincorporated place in DeKalb County, Georgia, United States. It was named after Newton J. Pitts, the original owner of a small, concrete block country store at the intersection of Tucker-Norcross Road and Chamblee-Tucker Road, now known as the community of Pittsburg. It also is on the Eastern Continental Divide, between the Atlantic Ocean, and the Gulf Of Mexico. The Divide takes a turn north here, towards Norcross GA.

References

External links
Civil War Marker at Pittsburgh

Unincorporated communities in the Atlanta metropolitan area
Unincorporated communities in Georgia (U.S. state)
Unincorporated communities in DeKalb County, Georgia